Stall is a municipality in the district of Spittal an der Drau in the Austrian state of Carinthia.

Geography
Stall lies in the central Möll Valley, between the Goldberg Group on the north and the Kreuzeck Group on the south.

References

Cities and towns in Spittal an der Drau District